Lomelin is an album by the Gerald Wilson Orchestra of the 80's recorded in 1981 and released on the Discovery label.

Reception

AllMusic rated the album with 4 stars; in his review, Scott Yanow noted: "Wilson's arranging style was essentially the same as it had been in the 1960s and his large big band featured many alumni plus some other younger L.A.-based jazzmen... The music is straight-ahead with plenty of solo space."

Track listing 
All compositions by Gerald Wilson.

 "Lomelin" - 9:05
 "Ay-Ee-En (Anthony Eric Nichols)" - 7:15
 "See You Later" - 6:37
 "You Know" - 7:30
 "Triple Chase" - 6:10
 "Blues for Zubin" - 8:20

Personnel 
Gerald Wilson - arranger, conductor
Bobby Bryant, Rick Baptist, Snooky Young, Oscar Brashear - trumpet, flugelhorn
Jimmy Cleveland, Garnett Brown, Thurman Green  - trombone
Maurice Spears - bass trombone
Jerome Richardson - flute, piccolo, alto saxophone, soprano saxophone, tenor saxophone
Buddy Collette, Henry de Vega, Roger Hogan - alto saxophone, flute, piccolo
Ernie Watts, Harold Land - tenor saxophone, flute
Jack Nimitz - baritone saxophone
Mike Wofford - piano
Harold Land, Jr. - electric piano
Robert Conti, Shuggie Otis - guitar  
Johnny Williams - bass 
Paul Humphrey - drums, percussion

References 

Gerald Wilson albums
1981 albums
Albums arranged by Gerald Wilson
Albums conducted by Gerald Wilson